Gennadiy Petrovich Bliznyuk (Henadz Bliznyuk, ; born 30 July 1980) is a Belarusian football coach and former player. A former forward, he played in his native Belarus, in Russia, in Germany and Azerbaijan.

Club career 
Bliznyuk began his career at Energiya Zhlobin in 1996. In 2004, he joined Russian club Sokol Saratov, and in summer 2005 returned to Belarus and signed a contract with BATE Borisov. Bliznyuk was a starter for BATE Borisov during their successful 2008–09 UEFA Champions League campaign. He scored several important goals in qualifying rounds, helping BATE to qualify to the group stage of the UEFA Champions League for the first time in their history. Bliznyuk participated in four of BATE's matches in the group stage. He left BATE on 13 January 2009 and signed a six-month contract with FSV Frankfurt.

International career 
Bliznyuk is a former member of Belarus national team.

Career statistics 
Scores and results list Belarus' goal tally first, score column indicates score after each Bliznyuk goal.

Honours 
Gomel
 Belarusian Premier League: 2003
 Belarusian Cup: 2001–02

BATE Borisov
 Belarusian Premier League: 2006,  2007,  2008
 Belarusian Cup: 2005–06

Torpedo-BelAZ Zhodino
 Belarusian Cup: 2015–16

Individual
 Belarusian Premier League top scorer: 2003, 2008

References

External links 

1980 births
Living people
People from Svietlahorsk District
Sportspeople from Gomel Region
Belarusian footballers
Association football forwards
Belarus international footballers
Russian Premier League players
2. Bundesliga players
FC Zhlobin players
FC BATE Borisov players
FSV Frankfurt players
FC Gomel players
FC Sokol Saratov players
FC Sibir Novosibirsk players
FC Belshina Bobruisk players
FC Khimik Svetlogorsk players
AZAL PFK players
FC Torpedo-BelAZ Zhodino players
FC Isloch Minsk Raion players
FC Energetik-BGU Minsk players
Belarusian expatriate footballers
Belarusian expatriate sportspeople in Russia
Expatriate footballers in Russia
Belarusian expatriate sportspeople in Germany
Expatriate footballers in Germany
Belarusian expatriate sportspeople in Azerbaijan
Expatriate footballers in Azerbaijan